Litvinism (or ) is a branch of nationalism, philosophy and political current in Belarus, which bases the history of its state on the heritage of the Grand Duchy of Lithuania and emphasizes the Baltic component of the Belarusian ethnic group. Opponents of Litvinism consider it a fringe pseudohistorical theory.

Some Litvinists reject their Belarusian national identity and affiliation with the Republic of Belarus, in favor of a reconstructed Baltic Catholic Litvin ("Lithuanian") identity, based on the history and legacy of the Grand Duchy of Lithuania. According to national censuses, only a few dozen residents of Belarus state their ethnic identity as Litvin rather than Belarusian.

History 

According to the Lithuanian author Tomas Baranauskas who claims to have coined the term, "Litvinism" is the synthesis of two different historiographies: the Tsarist Russian, which claimed that the Grand Duchy of Lithuania was a Russian state, and the interwar Polish historiography, which deemed the Polonized Lithuanians of eastern Lithuania proper as "Litwins" (i.e. "real Lithuanians"), in contrast to the "Lietuvisy" of the Republic of Lithuania.

Litvinism began following the Partitions of the Polish-Lithuanian Commonwealth, due to the Russian Empire's needs to change the old Grand Ducal Lithuanian identity into a new one that better meet the Empire's interests. Professor Osip Senkovsky from St. Petersburg University, originally from the Vilnius Region, collaborated with the Tsarist administration and developed the theory that the Lithuanian state's origin was Slavic and that it was allegedly created by the Ruthenians who had moved westwards due to Mongol attacks. Furthermore, his contemporary, the pseudo-historian I. Kulakovskis, propagated theses that Lithuania was Slavic before the creation of the Grand Duchy of Lithuania.

After the First World War, Józef Piłsudski's plans to restore Poland-Lithuania were shattered by Lithuanian desires for an independent state, manifested in the nation state of the Republic of Lithuania. For propaganda purposes, theories about how the inhabitants of the Republic of Lithuania are lietuvisai, who were unrelated to the "right" and "historical" Lithuanians, the Litvins, appeared. The Polish historian Feliks Karol Koneczny used the terms letuwskije, Letuwa and letuwini to describe the "fake Lithuanians" in his book Polska między Wschodem i Zachodem ("Poland between East and West") and other works. He also wrote about how Vilnius should belong to the Litvins and thus be a Polish-owned city, instead of a lietuvisai one.

The dissolution of the Soviet Union led to these ideas being taken over by some Belarusian nationalists seeking a national identity. The self-taught Belarusian historian Mikola Yermalovich stated that Lithuania began in the territory between Novogrudok and Minsk, i.e. in modern Belarusian lands, which allegedly occupied parts of modern Lithuania. M. Yermalovich considers Samogitia as the country's sole Baltic territory, while Aukštaitija is an artificially conceived ethnographic region occupying a part of the Belarusian lands. Litvinism's theories were developed even earlier by Pavlas Urbanas in the Belarusian diaspora, who presented his pseudo-scientific theories in his writings "On the National Nature of the Grand Duchy of Lithuania and Historical Term of Lithuania" (1964), "In the Light of Historical Facts" (1972), "Ethnic belongings of Ancient Litvins" (1994) and "Ancient Litvins. Language, origin, ethnicity". By the end of the 20th century, there were more disseminators of Litvinism's ideas: Vitovt Charopko popularized the concept of the Grand Duchy of Lithuania being a Belarusian state with Belarusian leaders, while Alyaksandr Kraucevich tried proving that the Lithuanian state's old capital and that the city where King Mindaugas had been crowned was Novogrudok.

In recent years, the number of followers of Litvinism in Belarus has been growing, and there is a division into even smaller, often marginal historical and ideological directions.

Litvinism is mostly espoused in books published in Belarus and on the Internet, as well as in English, which target a foreign audience in an attempt to disseminate M. Yermalovich's "discoveries" and the "real" history of the Grand Duchy of Lithuania. However, experts say that Litvinism is not widespread as it is marginal and sometimes associated with pro-Russian ideas. The Belarusian academia is dominated by a variety of ideas, e.g. ancient historians guided by Soviet guidelines and methodology, although there definitely is a number Litvinist scholars.

Identity 
The motivation behind some Belarusian cultural activists adopting the Litvin identity is a rejection of the Soviet ideology, the Soviet-imposed Pan-Slavism and simultaneously the Belarusian national identity which the Litvin activists claim to be Soviet-related. The Litvinists underline their closeness to Lithuanians, Poles and Ukrainians (Ruthenians) viewing the Grand Duchy of Lithuania as a common heritage of the nations that live on its former territory. Previously an idea exclusive to some intellectuals, after the dissolution of the Soviet Union in the 1990s, "Litvinism" gained popularity among some Belarusian civilians.

Litvinists consider the Grand Duchy of Lithuania as being a joint Baltic and Eastern Slavic state. Litvinists claim this duality due to the significant Russian influence on the state.

Language 
The Belarusian historian Jan Lyalevich, who identifies as Litvin, cited medieval Muscovite sources referring to the "Old Belarusian" language as the "Lithuanian language". He also describes the medieval Litvins as a "proto-nation that existed approximately since the 14th century to the late 19th century, when its remainders, represented by mostly Catholic szlachta and intelligentsia, disappeared".

Some Litvin activists are reported to teach their children altered forms of the Belarusian language considered more traditional and de-russified, or asking that their passport states their Litvin ethnicity. This may also extend to the Belarusian state, one example of this being the Belarusian historian Jan Lyalevich, who stated in 2017: "Personally, I am still convinced that it is not too late for returning to our state its real name: Lithuania" ( in Belarusian).

Assessment

In Belarus 
Litvinism does not have a relevant impact on Belarusian politics, with its supporters focusing more on areas such as education. It is opposed by the pro-Russian official ideology of the Lukashenka regime and the pro-European Belarusian opposition.

According to Aleś Čajčyc, the Information Secretary of the Rada of the Belarusian Democratic Republic, the Litvinism article on English Wikipedia was written by "Lithuanian marginals". However the same year after secretary's statement the official Twitter account of the exiled government tweeted that the coat of arms is "a symbol of centuries of friendship between Belarusians and Lithuanians".

In 2018, Alexander Lukashenko stated during an interview with the Echo of Moscow that "we are not the heirs of Kievan Rus', we are the heirs of Vilnius".

In 2022 July during the Independence Day celebration Alexander Lukashenko stated that the Grand Duchy of Lithuania was a "defensive alliance with the Baltic tribes, where the Slavs taught them to read, introduced them to the philosophy of Christianity".

In Lithuania 
Numerous Lithuanian authors view "Litvinism" as potentially dangerous or harmful for the modern Lithuanian state.

In Russia 
Tomas Baranauskas claims that Litvinism also has some supporters in Russia, although it is much less popular than in Belarus. Some Russian Litvinists refer to the Grand Duchy of Lithuania as a Russian state.

In an interview held by Lietuvos rytas, the Belarusian journalist Alesis Mikas stated that the Russian Government could be using the new phenomenon of Litvinism in Belarus as a form of hybrid warfare against Lithuania.

Lev Krishtapovich claims that:In fact, under the guise of Belarusian nationalism, or the so-called Litvinism, a Polish gentry clique stands aimed at transforming Belarus into Poland's eastern frontiers.

By international sources 
Litvinism is not supported by notable information sources such as Encyclopædia Britannica, which states that the Grand Duchy of Lithuania was exclusively created by Lithuanians, that Lithuania in the past ruled territories of present-day Belarus and that the Belarusians had no state and no national symbols until 1918. Notable historians such as Arnold J. Toynbee also support the approach that the Lithuanians conquered Ruthenian territories.

See also
 Coat of arms of Lithuania
 Belarusian nationalism
 Belarusian national revival
 Lithuanian national revival 
 Russification of Belarus 
 History of Belarus
 History of Lithuania
 Ethnographic Lithuania 
 Lithuanians in Belarus 
 Belarus–Lithuania relations

References

Citations

Bibliography
 
 

 
Grand Duchy of Lithuania
Belarusian nationalism
20th century in Belarus
21st century in Belarus
Historiography of Belarus
Historiography of Russia
Social movements in Belarus